The Hard Hat Riot occurred on May 8, 1970, in New York City. It started around noon when around 400 construction workers and around 800 office workers attacked around 1,000 demonstrators affiliated with the student strike of 1970. The students were protesting the May 4 Kent State shootings and the Vietnam War, following the April 30 announcement by President Richard Nixon of the U.S. invasion of neutral Cambodia. Some construction workers carried U.S. flags and chanted "USA, All the way", and "America, love it or leave it". Anti-war protesters shouted, “Peace now”.

The riot, first breaking out near the intersection of Wall Street and Broad Street in Lower Manhattan, led to a mob scene with more than 20,000 people in the streets, eventually leading to a siege of New York City Hall, an attack on the conservative Pace University, and lasted more than three hours. Around 100 people, including seven policemen, were injured on what became known as "Bloody Friday". Six people were arrested, but only one of them was a construction worker associated with the rioters. President Nixon then invited the hardhat leaders to Washington, D.C., and accepted a hardhat from them.

Background
On May 4, 1970, thirteen students were shot, four of them fatally, at Kent State University in Ohio by National Guardsmen as they demonstrated against the U.S. involvement in the Vietnam War and U.S. incursions into Cambodia. One of the dead was Jeffrey Glenn Miller, who was from a New York City suburb on Long Island, which led to funeral proceedings in Manhattan and Long Island, which helped fuel local activism. In the days before the riot, there were anti-war protests on Wall Street and smaller clashes between construction workers and anti-war demonstrators. As a show of sympathy for the dead students, Republican Mayor of New York City John Lindsay ordered all flags at New York City Hall to be flown at half-staff on May 8, the day of the riot.

The U.S. labor movement was deeply divided over support for President Richard Nixon's Vietnam War policy. AFL–CIO president George Meany and most labor leaders in the United States were vehemently anti-communist and thus strongly supported U.S. military involvement in Southeast Asia.

Peter J. Brennan, president of the Building and Construction Trades Council of Greater New York, was a strong supporter of Nixon's policy of Vietnamization and ending American involvement in the war. Brennan was also president of the Building and Construction Trades Council of New York, the statewide umbrella group for construction unions, and the vice president of the New York City Central Labor Council and the New York State AFL–CIO, umbrella groups for all labor unions in these respective areas. Brennan was a registered Democrat who had lobbied strongly for Democrats through the 1950s and 1960s, but increasingly supported Republican candidates as support for skilled labor unions decreased. The building and construction unions were overwhelmingly white, Catholic, blue-collar and male. Although blue-collar whites were not generally more pro-war than upscale whites, the anti-war movement was particularly unpopular among blue collar whites. In response to flag desecration within the anti-war movement and perceived rejection of returning veterans, a disproportionate majority of whom were blue-collar, blue-collar whites came to oppose the anti-war demonstrators, who tended to be college-educated, a group which were disproportionately non-veterans.

The riot
At 7:30 a.m. on May 8, several-hundred anti-war protesters, mostly college students, began picketing the New York Stock Exchange, and later held a protest and memorial at Federal Hall National Memorial for the four dead students at Kent State. By late morning, when some high school students, teachers, and others joined, the protesters now numbered more than a thousand. They were gathered in the street in front of Federal Hall and on the steps around the statue of George Washington. Paul O'Dwyer was among the speakers. The protesters demanded an end to the war in Vietnam and Cambodia, the release of political prisoners in the United States, such as Black Panther Party leaders Huey Newton and Bobby Seale, and an end to military-related research on all university campuses.

Shortly before noon, more than 400 construction workers, many of whom were building the World Trade Center, converged on the student rally at Federal Hall from four directions. Some construction workers carried U.S. flags and chanted "USA, All the way", and "America, love it or leave it". Anti-war protesters shouted, "Peace now." More than 800 office workers soon joined the construction workers' ranks. Hundreds more construction workers arrived around noon, as the lunch-time crowd and onlookers in the streets exceeded 20,000. A thin and inadequate line of police, who were largely sympathetic to the workers' position, formed to separate the construction workers from the anti-war protesters.  Construction workers then broke through the police lines and began chasing students through the streets. The workers attacked those who looked like hippies and beat them with their hard hats and other weapons, including tools and steel-toe boots. Victims and onlookers reported that the police stood by and did little.

Hundreds of construction workers and counter-protesters moved up Broadway, making their way to City Hall Park toward City Hall. They pushed their way to the top of the steps, singing City Hall as some chanted "Hey, hey, whattya say? We support the USA", while some held American flags, then attempted to gain entrance because they demanded the flag above City Hall be raised to full staff. Police on duty at City Hall, and reinforcement, were able to stop the men from getting inside. A few workers were asked to enter the building to calm tensions. A postal worker who was already inside went to the roof of city hall and raised the U.S. flag there to full mast. When one mayoral aide lowered the flag back down to half-mast, hundreds of construction workers stormed the area around City Hall, leading to melee like on Wall Street the hour prior. Deputy Mayor Richard Aurelio, fearing the building would be overrun by the mob, ordered city workers to raise the flag back to full mast.

Rioting construction workers also attacked buildings near city hall. Many were Catholic "white ethnics". Several workmen ripped the Red Cross flag down at nearby Trinity Church, because the flag was associated with the anti-war protestors, though it was planted to signal a first aid haven. Several groups of construction workers stormed the newly built main Pace University building, smashing lobby windows and beating up students and professors, including with tools. Ironically, Pace was a conservative business-oriented school where the most popular major was accounting—hardly a hotbed of activism. More than 100 people were injured. The injured included seven policemen. Most of the injured required hospital treatment. The most common victim was a "22-year-old white male collegian" and the worst injuries were to the "half-dozen young men beaten unconscious," but about one in four of the injured were women. Six people were arrested, but only one construction worker was arrested by police.

Aftermath

During a press conference that evening, President Nixon tried to defuse the situation before tens of thousands of students arrived in Washington, D.C. for a scheduled protest rally the next day. Before dawn, the next morning, Nixon told some protesters that "I understand just how you feel", and defended the recent U.S. troop movements into Cambodia as aiding their goal of peace.

Mayor Lindsay severely criticized the police for their lack of action. New York City police leaders later accused Lindsay of "undermining the confidence of the public in its police department" by his statements, and blamed the inaction on inadequate preparations and "inconsistent directives" in the past from the mayor's office.

The next week, Brennan claimed "the unions had nothing to do with it", and that workers allegedly "fed up" with violence and flag desecration by anti-war demonstrators, and denied that anything except fists had been used against the demonstrators, though police records showed tools and some iron pipes were used. Brennan claimed telephone calls and letters to the unions were 20 to 1 in favor of the workers. One man, Edward Shufro, of the brokerage firm Rose and Ehrman, saw two men wearing grey suits directing the workers. The NYPD "buried most records of police malfeasance", according to Kuhn's The Hardhat Riot, and in August 1970, the NYPD published a report that largely acquitted itself of any collusion with construction workers though its own records were decades later shown to undercut that report. The construction workers and police were both mostly "white ethnics", lived in the same neighborhoods, and socialized in similar establishments; many were also veterans of World War II and Korea and both were also disproportionately likely to have family and friends in Vietnam. On Sunday, May 10, Nixon's Chief of Staff H. R. Haldeman wrote in his diary, "The college demonstrators have overplayed their hands, evidence is the blue-collar group rising up against them, and [the] president can mobilize them".

Several thousand construction workers, longshoremen and white-collar workers protested against the Mayor on May 11, holding signs reading "impeach the Red Mayor" and chanting "Lindsay is a bum". They held another rally May 16, carrying signs calling the mayor a "rat", "commy rat" and "traitor". Mayor Lindsay described the mood of the city as "taut".

The rallies culminated in a large rally on May 20 in which an estimated 150,000 construction workers, longshoremen, and others rallied outside city hall. When the workers later marched down Broadway, many office workers in surrounding buildings showed their support by showering the marchers with ticker tape. One magazine coined the day, "Workers' Woodstock".

On May 26, Brennan led a delegation of 22 union leaders, who represented more than 300,000 tradesmen, to meet with President Nixon at the White House and presented him with several ceremonial hard hats, and a flag pin. Nixon said he sought to honor those “labor leaders and people from Middle America who still have character and guts and a bit of patriotism”. Nixon general counsel Charles Colson, who organized the meeting and was later in charge of developing a strategy to win union support for Nixon in the 1972 presidential election, identified Brennan as a friendly labor leader due to his role in organizing the counter-protests in the weeks after "Bloody Friday".

Brennan later organized significant labor union political support for Nixon in the 1972 election. Nixon appointed Brennan as his labor secretary after the election as a reward for his support and he was retained by President Gerald Ford into 1975, following Nixon's resignation. The book The Hardhat Riot wrote  of the riot that it was the day when the Old Left attacked the New Left, because "two liberalisms collided that day, presaging the long Democratic civil war ahead", and that the riot and demonstrations after captured the "era when FDR’s everyman first turned against the liberalism that once had championed him" and Nixon "moved the Republican Party from blue bloods to blue collars". In their reviews of The Hardhat Riot, the New York Daily News wrote that the riot "changed American politics, perhaps forever"  and, in the New York Times, Clyde Haberman characterized the riot as "a blue-collar rampage whose effects still ripple, not the least of them being Donald Trump’s improbable ascension to the presidency".

See also

 List of incidents of civil unrest in New York City
 List of incidents of civil unrest in the United States
 New Left

Notes

References
 Bigart, Homer. "Huge City Hall Rally Backs Nixon's Indochina Policies", New York Times. May 21, 1970.
 Bigart, Homer. "War Foes Here Attacked By Construction Workers", New York Times. May 9, 1970.
 Fink, Gary M., ed. Biographical Dictionary of American Labor, Westport, Ct.: Greenwood Press, 1984; 
 Foner, Philip S. U.S. Labor and the Vietnam War (paperback ed.) New York: International Publishers, 1989; 
 Freeman, Joshua B. "Hardhats: Construction Workers, Manliness, and the 1970 Pro-War Demonstrations", Journal of Social History (Summer 1993).
 Kifner, John. "4 Kent State Students Killed by Troops", New York Times, May 5, 1970.
 Kuhn, David Paul. "The Hardhat Riot: Nixon, New York City, and the Dawn of the White Working-Class Revolution," New York: Oxford University Press, 2020. 
 McFadden, Robert D. "Peter Brennan, 78, Union Head and Nixon's Labor Chief", New York Times. October 4, 1996.
 Naughton, James M. "Construction Union Chief in New York Is Chosen to Succeed Hodgson", New York Times, November 30, 1972.
 Perlmutter, Emanuel. "Head of Building Trades Unions Here Says Response Favors Friday's Action", New York Times, May 12, 1970.
 Semple, Jr., Robert B. "Nixon Meets Heads Of 2 City Unions", New York Times, May 27, 1970.
 Shabecoff, Philip. "Brennan Choice Called Political Move", New York Times December 1, 1972.
 Stetson, Damon. "Brennan Reports Labor Leaders Favoring Nixon Are Organizing", New York Times, September 9, 1972.
 Stetson, Damon. "200 Labor Chiefs in City Form Nixon Committee", New York Times, September 28, 1972.

Protests against the Vietnam War
Kent State shootings
Political riots in the United States
Labor-related riots in the United States
Riots and civil disorder in New York City

Right-wing populism in the United States
1970 riots
1970 in New York City
May 1970 events in the United States
1970s crimes in New York City
Labor disputes in New York City